The women's 800 metre freestyle event at the 2020 Summer Olympics was held from 29 to 31 July 2021 at the Tokyo Aquatics Centre. It was the event's 14th consecutive appearance, having been held at every edition since 1968. Katie Ledecky won the gold medal, becoming the first person to win the event three consecutive times, as well as the youngest and oldest person to win the 800 free (at age 15 in 2012 and age 24 in 2021).

Records
Prior to this competition, the existing world and Olympic records were as follows.

No new records were set during the competition.

Qualification

 
The Olympic Qualifying Time for the event was 8:33.36. Up to two swimmers per National Olympic Committee (NOC) could automatically qualify by swimming that time at an approved qualification event. The Olympic Selection Time was 8:48.76. Up to one swimmer per NOC meeting that time was eligible for selection, allocated by world ranking until the maximum quota for all swimming events was reached. NOCs without a female swimmer qualified in any event could also use their universality place.

Competition format

The competition consisted of two rounds: heats and a final. The swimmers with the best 8 times in the heats advanced to the final. Swim-offs were used as necessary to break ties for advancement to the next round.

Schedule
All times are Japan Standard Time (UTC+9)

Results

Heats
The swimmers with the top 8 times, regardless of heat, advanced to the final.

Final

References

Women's 00800 metre freestyle
Olympics
Women's events at the 2020 Summer Olympics
2021 in women's swimming